Türi Landscape Conservation Area is a nature park which is located in Järva County, Estonia.

The area of the nature park is 3575 ha.

The protected area was founded in 2010 to protect Türi Kame Field and its surrounding areas.

References

Nature reserves in Estonia
Geography of Järva County